Lehen na Pohorju is a dispersed settlement in the Pohorje Hills in the Municipality of Podvelka in Slovenia.

Mass grave
Lehen na Pohorju is the site of a mass grave from the Second World War. The Lehen Mass Grave is located above the Urbanc farm, at Lehen na Pohorju no. 17. It contains the remains of eight Slovene civilians. They had sought to join a local Partisan unit, but were accused of being spies. The Partisans tortured and then murdered the victims on 4 January 1944, and burned their bodies. The local people collected the remains and buried them in the forest above the house.

References

External links
Lehen na Pohorju on Geopedia

Populated places in the Municipality of Podvelka